Carex gracilior, the slender sedge, is a species of sedge that was first described by Kenneth Mackenzie in 1917. It is native to California.

References

gracilior
Plants described in 1917